Operation Body Count is a 1994 first-person shooter that uses the Wolfenstein 3D engine. It was developed and published by Capstone Software.

Plot
Terrorists have taken over the headquarters of the United Nations and have seized the government officials in the building. They are now being held as hostages in the top floor of the building by Victor, the leader of the terrorist gang.

As a member of a special Government Assault Team, it is up to the player to command their team and reach the top floor (the 40th level), rescue the hostages and eliminate the terrorist threat by killing Victor.

Gameplay
Using a modified Wolfenstein 3D engine, the gameplay is very similar to the majority of other clones of the time. The game consists of 40 levels. The first few levels are set in the sewers, where the player attempts to make their way up to the basement of the building.

Upon getting into the UNN building, the player then combat the terrorists. When level 40 is reached, the player come face-to-face with Victor himself.

Reception

PC Gamer rated the game 64%, comparing the enemies to cardboard-cutouts, describing the weapons as mediocre and criticizing the wall textures as dark and grainy making it hard to see activity in the level.

References

External links

1994 video games
DOS games
DOS-only games
First-person shooters
U.S. Gold games
Video games developed in the United States
Wolfenstein 3D engine games
Sprite-based first-person shooters
Commercial video games with freely available source code
Video games with 2.5D graphics
Games commercially released with DOSBox